Arthur Lowe (8 January 1906 – 29 December 1950) was an Australian rules footballer who played for the North Melbourne Football Club in the Victorian Football League (VFL).

Notes

External links 

1906 births
1950 deaths
Australian rules footballers from Victoria (Australia)
Australian Rules footballers: place kick exponents
North Melbourne Football Club players
Coburg Football Club players